The Colentina is a left tributary of the river Dâmbovița in Romania. It discharges into the Dâmbovița near Bălăceanca. It passes through the city of Bucharest and the villages and towns Călugăreni, Bălănești, Ghimpați, Ciocănești, Crevedia, Buftea, Mogoșoaia, Pantelimon and Cernica.

The following lakes are built on the river:

Lake Moarta
Lake Ciocăneşti I
Lake Ciocăneşti I
Lake Crevedia VI
Lake Buftea
Lake Mogoşoaia
Lake Chitila
Lake Străuleşti - 39 ha.
Lake Griviţa - 80 ha.
Lake Băneasa - 40 ha.
Lake Herăstrău - 77 ha.
Lake Floreasca - 70 ha.
Lake Tei - 80 ha.
Lake Plumbuita - 55 ha.
Lake Fundeni - 123 ha.
Lake Pantelimon I - 120 ha.
Lake Pantelimon II - 260 ha.
Lake Cernica - 360 ha.

References

Rivers of Romania
Rivers of Bucharest
Rivers of Dâmbovița County
Rivers of Ilfov County